Gümüshtigin Gazi (died 1104), also known as Melikgazi Gümüshtigin  was the second ruler of the Danishmendids which his father Danishmend Gazi had founded in central-eastern Anatolia after the Battle of Manzikert.

He succeeded his father when the father died in 1084.

During the First Crusade, he was directly on the path of the advancing Crusaders. On the losing side at the Battle of Dorylaeum in 1097, he scored a success in capturing Bohemond I of Antioch in 1100. He continued campaigning against the Crusaders, extending southwards and capturing Malatya in 1103 after the Battle of Melitene. Shortly after his capture of Antalya in 1104 from the Crusaders, he died of an illness. Shortly after his death, the Crusaders recaptured Antalya and Malatya from the Muslim Turks.

In popular culture
 appears as a character called "Gümüştekin Bey" in the Turkish TV series Diriliş: Ertuğrul, which is based on Gazi Gümüshtigin.

References

Turkic rulers
Muslims of the First Crusade
1104 deaths
Year of birth unknown
12th-century rulers in Asia
12th-century Turkic people
Danishmend dynasty